This is a list of the women who have been queen consort of the Hashemite Kingdom of Jordan since the emirate was elevated to the status of a kingdom in 1949. As all monarchs of Jordan have been required by law to be male, there has never been a queen regnant of Jordan.

It is necessary for the king to give his wife the title of Queen consort after his accession and their marriage; otherwise she has only the lesser title of Princess consort. Only one Jordanian consort has not held the title of Queen during her marriage.

List of royal consorts

Notes

 
Jordanian royal consorts
Jordan
Consorts
Jordan